Dirocoremia ingae' is a species of beetle in the family Cerambycidae. It was described by Marques in 1994.

References

Rhopalophorini
Beetles described in 1994